Freestyle skiing at the 2016 Winter Youth Olympics was held at the Hafjell Freepark and Oslo Vinterpark from 14 to 19 February. Besides 6 freestyle skiing events, 1 mixed event was held together with snowboarders.

Medal summary

Medal table

Boys' Events

Girls' Events

Qualification system
All quotas were distributed using the results of the 2015 World Junior Championships. Each nation was allowed to enter one athlete per event. The total quota was 80 athletes (32 in ski cross, 24 in slopestyle and 24 in halfpipe).

Summary

References

External links
Results Book – Freestyle skiing

 
2016 in freestyle skiing
2016 Winter Youth Olympics events
2016